WEJZ (96.1 FM) is a commercial radio station licensed to Jacksonville, Florida.  It is owned by Renda Broadcasting and airs a mainstream adult contemporary radio format.  WEJZ is the Jacksonville affiliate for the syndicated Delilah and John Tesh.  Between mid-November and December 26 each year, the station switches to all-Christmas music.

WEJZ's studios and offices are located on Atlantic Boulevard in the Arlington district of Jacksonville, and the transmitter is downtown, on a tower used by other radio and TV stations.  WEJZ is a Class C radio station, broadcasting at 100,000 watts effective radiated power (ERP) from an antenna at nearly 1,000 feet, height above average terrain (HAAT).  The signal stretches from Brunswick, Georgia, to Gainesville, Florida.

History
In 1948, the station first signed on as WMBR-FM, sister station to WMBR (now WQOP).  It was owned by the Florida Broadcasting Company, which the following year put WMBR-TV on the air, the second TV station in Florida (now WJXT).  WMBR-FM simulcast the programming of its AM counterpart.

In the 1950s, the Washington Post bought the TV station, while the radio stations came under the ownership of WMBR, Incorporated.  In 1965, 96.1 became WKTZ-FM, when it was bought by Jones College, and was paired with WKTZ.  The two stations aired a beautiful music format of soft instrumentals, with limited talk and commercials.

On October 1, 1985, 96.1 was bought by the Kravis Company, which already owned WRXJ (now WFXJ).  The call sign became WLCS-FM, airing a soft adult contemporary format.  Meanwhile, WKTZ-FM, still owned by Jones College, became non-commercial, moving to 90.9 MHz (now K-Love station WJKV).

On June 21, 1987, WLCS was bought by WIN Communications.  The new owners changed the call letters to the current WEJZ, continuing its Soft AC format and rebranding the station "Lite 96.1."

In June 1990, the station was acquired by Renda Broadcasting.  In January 2015, WEJZ dropped the "Lite" in its name, rebranded as "96.1 WEJZ", and moved to a more upbeat playlist of mainstream adult contemporary songs from the 1980s to current hits.

References

External links
WEJZ official website

EJZ
Mainstream adult contemporary radio stations in the United States
Renda Broadcasting radio stations
1948 establishments in Florida
Radio stations established in 1948